Midong District is one of 7 urban districts of the prefecture-level city of Wulumuqi, the capital of Xinjiang Uygur Autonomous Region, Northwest China.

History
Midong District was formed in 2007 by merging the former Dongshan District of Ürümqi (population of 100,000, as per the 2002 Census) with the Miquan (formerly part of Changji Hui Autonomous Prefecture).

Geography
Midong District includes northern and eastern suburbs of Ürümqi, as well as a large slice of the Gurbantünggüt Desert north of the city which is administratively included into Ürümqi.

The natural water sources in the Ürümqi area mostly consist of streams that flow from the snow-capped Tian Shan mountains south of the city. Since Midong District is located north and therefore downstream, of the main urban area, the water supply problems there are particularly acute. To enable the area's economic development, the Irtysh–Ürümqi Canal was brought to Midong during the first decade of the 20th century. Its main terminal is the so-called "Reservoir 500", constructed at the border of Midong District and Fukang County-level City.

Climate

References

County-level divisions of Xinjiang
Ürümqi